Bushy Park may refer to:
Alternative name to Bushey, Hertfordshire, England
Bushy Park, a Royal Park in London, England
Bushy Park (New Zealand), a forest located on the west coast of the North Island of New Zealand
Bushy Park, Tasmania, Australia
Bushy Park, Barbados
Bushy Park, Glenwood Maryland, USA
Bushy Park, Victoria, Australia
Bushy Park Wetlands, a conservation park in Melbourne, Australia
Bushy Park, Dublin, Ireland

See also
Bushey Park